John Franklin-Adams (1843 – 1912) was a British astronomer and stellar cartographer. The minor planets 982 Franklina and 1925 Franklin-Adams are named after him.

References 

19th-century British astronomers
1843 births
1912 deaths
People from Peckham